American singer-songwriter Taylor Swift has appeared in 60 music videos, and released five documentaries, three video albums, and a short film, as well as featured in numerous films and television shows. From her eponymous debut studio album (2006), she released music videos for the singles "Tim McGraw", "Teardrops on My Guitar", "Our Song", and "Picture to Burn", all directed by Trey Fanjoy and released from 2006 to 2008. She followed with three other music videos in 2008—"Beautiful Eyes" from her extended play of the same name, "Change" from the AT&T Team USA Soundtrack and "Love Story" from her second studio album Fearless (2008). The latter was nominated for two awards at the 2009 CMT Music Awards—Video of the Year and Female Video of the Year. For the video of "You Belong with Me" she won Best Female Video at the 2009 MTV Video Music Awards. 

Swift's third studio album Speak Now (2010) spawned the single "Mine", whose music video was directed by herself and Roman White, who previously directed two of her videos. It was followed by videos for "Back to December" and "Mean" in 2010, and "The Story of Us", "Sparks Fly" and "Ours" in 2011. The fourth studio album Red (2012) was preceded by the music video for the single "We Are Never Ever Getting Back Together". The "I Knew You Were Trouble" video won Swift a second MTV Video Music Award for Best Female Video in 2013. Swift further released six music videos in 2013—five from Red; "22", "Everything Has Changed" featuring Ed Sheeran, "Red", "Begin Again" and "The Last Time", and the Tim McGraw collaboration "Highway Don't Care".

Her fifth album 1989 (2014) produced the 2014 music videos for "Shake It Off" and "Blank Space", with the latter becoming the fastest video to reach one billion views on Vevo, "Style", "Bad Blood" and "Wildest Dreams" in 2015, and "Out of the Woods" and "New Romantics" in 2016. The videos for "Blank Space" and "Bad Blood", featuring rapper Kendrick Lamar, won four accolades at the 2015 MTV Video Music Awards, with the latter winning for Video of the Year and Best Collaboration. It also received a Grammy Award for Best Music Video. Swift released four music videos for her sixth studio album Reputation (2017)—"Look What You Made Me Do", "...Ready for It?", "End Game" featuring Sheeran and rapper Future, and "Delicate". Her seventh studio album, Lover (2019), was supported by four music videos as well—"Me!" featuring Brendon Urie of Panic! at the Disco, "You Need to Calm Down", "Lover", and the self-directed "The Man" in her solo directorial debut. The Lover videos won four accolades at the 2019 MTV Video Music Awards, including Video of the Year and Video for Good and Best Visual Effects. She also began writing and directing her own music videos, such as for "Cardigan" and "Willow" in 2020, and "Anti-Hero" and "Bejeweled" in 2022. Swift debuted as a filmmaker with All Too Well: The Short Film (2021), writing and directing it.

Swift has released the live/video albums Taylor Swift and Def Leppard (2009), Speak Now World Tour – Live (2011), and Journey to Fearless (2011), and the documentary films/specials The 1989 World Tour Live (2015), Reputation Stadium Tour (2018), Miss Americana (2020), City of Lover (2020) and Folklore: The Long Pond Studio Sessions (2020). She has appeared in the television shows CSI: Crime Scene Investigation in 2009, Saturday Night Live in 2009 and New Girl in 2013. In film, she has starred in Valentine's Day (2010), and provided her voice in the animated film The Lorax (2012). She has also appeared in a number of commercials, including for Band Hero (2009), Coca-Cola (2014) and Apple Music (2016).

Music videos

Video albums

Filmography

Television

Commercials

References 

Actress filmographies
Videography
Videographies of American artists
American filmographies